Pat Boone Sings Irving Berlin is a studio album by Pat Boone, released in 1957 on Dot Records.

Irving Berlin said of the album: "Pat Boone sings these ballads the way I like to hear them sung."

Track listing

References 

1957 albums
Pat Boone albums
Dot Records albums